Michael Vincenzo Gazzo (April 5, 1923 – February 14, 1995) was an American playwright who later in life became a film and television actor. He was nominated for an Academy Award for his role in The Godfather Part II (1974).

Biography
Gazzo was born on April 5, 1923. He was of Italian-American descent. Gazzo served in the United States Army Air Forces during World War II. He was a member of the Actors Studio and later trained actors such as Debra Winger, Henry Silva and Tony Sirico. He wrote A Hatful of Rain, a Broadway play about drug addiction, which ran for 389 performances in 1955 and 1956. It starred Ben Gazzara and Shelley Winters in the two lead roles, and was adapted into a film by Oscar-winning director Fred Zinnemann in 1957. The movie was nominated for an Academy Award for Best Actor in a Leading Role (Anthony Franciosa). A 1968 made-for-television version (as a filmed play) starred Peter Falk, Sandy Dennis and Michael Parks. Gazzo's other screen writing credits include the Elvis Presley American musical drama King Creole in 1958. Gazzo authored the Broadway play The Night Circus, also starring Ben Gazzara.

Gazzo was nominated for an Academy Award for Best Supporting Actor for his role as Frank Pentangeli in The Godfather Part II.

Death
Gazzo died on February 14, 1995, at age 71 due to complications from a stroke. He was buried in the Westwood Village Memorial Park Cemetery in Los Angeles.

Filmography

 On the Waterfront (1954) - Bit (uncredited)
 A Man Called Adam (1966) - (uncredited)
 Out of It (1969) - Vinnie's friend
 The Gang That Couldn't Shoot Straight (1971) - A Black Suit
 Crazy Joe (1974)
 The Godfather Part II (1974) - Frank Pentangeli
 Kojak (1975) - Joel Adrian
 Brinks: The Great Robbery (1976) - Mario Russo
 Ellery Queen (Episode "The Adventure of Caesar's Last Sleep") (1976) - Benny Franks
 Welcome Back, Kotter (Season 2, Episode 12 "Hark, the Sweatkings") (1976) - Angelo DeMora
 Alice (1977) - Gino Tarantella
 Starsky and Hutch (1977) - Joe Durniak
 Barnaby Jones (1977) - Mr. Farinelli
 Baretta (1977) - Rico Giove
 Black Sunday (1977) - Muzi
 The Feather and Father Gang (Season 1, Episode 12 "The Mayan Connection") (1977) - Gutman
 Columbo episode Murder Under Glass (1978) - Vittorio Rossi
 Fingers (1978) - Ben
 King of the Gypsies (1978) - Spiro Giorgio
 Love and Bullets (1979) - Lobo
 The Fish That Saved Pittsburgh (1979) - Harry the Trainer
 Beggarman, Thief (1979) - Sartene
 Fantasy Island (Season 3, Episode 14 "The Lookalikes/Winemaker") (1979) - Frank Lassiter
 Taxi (1979) - Vince
 Cuba Crossing (1980) - Rossellini 
 Alligator (1980) - Chief Clark
 Border Cop (1980) - Chico Suarez
 Hoodlums (1980) - Gus Azziello
 Sizzle (1980) 
 Magnum, P.I. episode "The Ugliest Dog in Hawaii" (1981) - Victor DiGorgio
 Back Roads (1981) - Tazio
 Body and Soul (1981) - Frankie
 The Winter of Our Discontent (1983) - Marullo
 Sudden Impact (1983) - Threlkis (uncredited)
 Cannonball Run II (1984) - Sonny
 Fear City (1984) - Mike
 Cookie (1989) - Carmine
 Beyond the Ocean (1990)
 Forever (1991)
  (1992)
 Last Action Hero (1993) - Torelli
 L.A. Law (1994) (episode "McKenzie, Brackman, Barnum & Bailey") (1994) - Roscoe Zambini
 Nothing to Lose (1994) - Joe (final film role)

References

Sources
 Bacarella, Michael, ItalActors: 101 Years of Italian Actors in U.S. Entertainment, The National Italian American Foundation

External links
 
 
 
 Michael Gazzo at the University of Wisconsin's Actors Studio audio collection

1923 births
1995 deaths
People from Hillside, New Jersey
American male screenwriters
American male film actors
American male television actors
American writers of Italian descent
Burials at Westwood Village Memorial Park Cemetery
20th-century American male actors
20th-century American dramatists and playwrights
20th-century American male writers
Screenwriters from New Jersey
20th-century American screenwriters